The Barbara Vine Mysteries is a British television mystery drama series, principally written by Sandy Welch and Jacqueline Holborough and directly solely by Tim Fywell, that first broadcast on BBC1 on 10 May 1992.

Adapted from a series of novels written by Ruth Rendell under the pseudonym of Barbara Vine, the series was the BBC's attempt to rival ITV's ratings winner The Ruth Rendell Mysteries, which was set to lose its lead actor, George Baker, in the same year. Three series were broadcast, with the final episode broadcasting on 3 January 1994, shortly before The Ruth Rendell Mysteries went back into production, adapting Rendell's novels without the character of Inspector Wexford for the first time.

Certain aspects of each of the novels were modified for their television adaptations; the most notable of these being A Dark-Adapted Eye, which saw its storyline significantly altered, including the introduction of an entirely new character, an Italian lawyer played by Ciarán Hinds, who does not feature in the book. All three series were released as a complete box set via 2|Entertain DVD on 31 October 2005.

Cast

A Fatal Inversion

 Douglas Hodge as Adam 
 Jeremy Northam as Rufus
 Saira Todd as Zosie 
 Rachel Joyce as Anne 
 Patricia Kerrigan as Marigold 
 Gordon Warnecke as Shiva 
 Michael Simkins as D.C. Stretton 
 Julia Ford as Vivien 
 Janet Steel as Lily 
 Philip Bowen as Alec Chipstead 
 Jane Wymark as Meg Chipstead 
 Nicholas Woodeson as Insp. Winder 
 Clara Salaman as Mary 
 Philip Glenister as D.C. McCann

Gallowglass

 Michael Sheen as Joe 
 Paul Rhys as Sandor 
 Arkie Whiteley as Nina 
 John McArdle as Paul Garnet 
 Gary Waldhorn as Ralph Apsoland 
 Harriet Owen as Jessica 
 Claire Hackett as Tilly 
 Nerys Hughes as Diana
 Barbara Hicks as Joan 
 Trevor Cooper as Stan 
 Paolo Giovannucci as Cesare
 Susan Porrett	as Doreen 
 Bruno Scipioni as Adelmo 
 Stefanie McFeat as Debbie

A Dark-Adapted Eye

 Helena Bonham Carter as Faith Severn
 Celia Imrie as Vera
 Sophie Ward as Eden 
 Robin Ellis as John 
 Bernice Stegers as Vranni 
 William Gaminara as Andrew 
 Pip Torrens as Chad 
 Rachel Bell as Mrs. Morell 
 Steven Mackintosh as Francis 
 Polly Adams as Helen 
 Kelly Marcel as Young Vera 
 David Cann as Albert March 
 Jane Hollowood as Mrs. March 
 Randal Herley as General 
 Richard Syms as Rev. Morell 
 Emma Shaw as Josie Cambus

Episodes

Series 1 (1992)

Series 2 (1993)

Series 3 (1994)

References

External links

1992 British television series debuts
1994 British television series endings
1990s British drama television series
1990s British mystery television series
1990s British television miniseries
BBC television dramas
English-language television shows
Television shows based on British novels
Television shows set in the United Kingdom
Films directed by Tim Fywell